Dr Colin Winston Abrams (born 14 March 1956) is a Guyanese/American former Olympic cyclist. He competed in the sprint event at the 1988 Summer Olympics.

References

External links
 

1956 births
Living people
Guyanese male cyclists
Olympic cyclists of Guyana
Cyclists at the 1988 Summer Olympics
Place of birth missing (living people)